Replay 4 is a proprietary backup and disaster recovery software for Windows application servers developed by AppAssure Software and released on September 9, 2009.

Replay 4 uses an image-based approach for backup  taking a snapshot at a moment in time. It provides application integration with mission-critical Microsoft applications, including Microsoft Exchange, SQL, SharePoint, and Hyper-V. Replay 4 also supports Windows Small Business Servers, Domain Controllers, File servers, Web servers, and BlackBerry enterprise servers. Replay 4 provides support for advanced features such as block level snapshots with incremental forever data capture, integrated data deduplication, bare-metal restore to dissimilar hardware, failover virtual machines, offsite cloud recovery, etc. The latest version adds the ability to replicate data to off-site storage, and also incorporates new technology for data deduplication.

Awards 

Replay 4 was named 2009 Backup and Disaster Recovery Software Product of the Year by Storage Magazine in February 2010. In May 2010, Replay 4 was named New Server Software Product of the Year at the 8th annual American Business Awards.

See also 

 List of backup software

References

External links 
 Official website
 Replay 4 Administrator's Guide
 Replay 4 Release Notes

Backup software
Backup software for Windows